Jane Kenyon (May 23, 1947 – April 22, 1995) was an American poet and translator. Her work is often characterized as simple, spare, and emotionally resonant. Kenyon was the second wife of poet, editor, and critic Donald Hall who made her the subject of many of his poems.

Life
Kenyon was born in 1947 in Ann Arbor, Michigan to Ruele and Pauline, she grew up in the Midwest. She earned a B.A. from the University of Michigan in 1970 and an M.A. in 1972. She won a Hopwood Award at Michigan. As a university student Kenyon met poet Donald Hall; though he was some nineteen years her senior, she married him in 1972, and they moved to his ancestral home in Wilmot, New Hampshire. Kenyon was New Hampshire's poet laureate when she died on April 22, 1995 from leukemia.

Career
Four collections of Kenyon's poems were published during her lifetime: From Room to Room (1978), The Boat of Quiet Hours (1986), Let Evening Come (1990) and Constance (1993); apart from the former being published through Alice James Books, all of her writing was released through Graywolf Press. She spent some years translating the poems of Anna Akhmatova from Russian into English, and she championed translation as an important art that every poet should try.

Kenyon's poems are filled with rural images: light streaming through a hayloft, shorn winter fields. She wrote frequently about wrestling with depression, which plagued her throughout her adult life. Kenyon's poem "Having it out with Melancholy" describes this struggle and the brief moments of happiness she felt when taking an MAOI, Nardil. However, two visits to India in the early 1990s led to a crisis of faith, as Hall (in introductions to her books and in his own memoirs), Alice Mattison, and her biographer John Timmerman have described.

Kenyon was also a contributor to Columbia: A Journal of Literature and Art.

Prior to her death, she was editing the collection Otherwise: New and Selected Poems. Kenyon's papers, including manuscripts, personal journals, and notebooks are held at the University of New Hampshire Library Special Collections and Archives.

In popular culture 
"Let Evening Come" was featured in the 2005 film In Her Shoes, in a scene where the character played by Cameron Diaz reads the poem (as well as "One Art" by Elizabeth Bishop) to a blind nursing home resident.

"Having it out with Melancholy" has been read by Amanda Palmer on Brain Pickings.

Awards
1994 PEN/Voelcker Award for Poetry

Bibliography
 From Room to Room (November 1, 1978)
 The Boat of Quiet Hours (October 24, 1986)
 Let Evening Come (April 30, 1990)
 Constance (July 12, 1993)
 Otherwise: New & Selected Poems (March 2, 1996; posthumous release)
 Collected Poems (September 1, 2005; posthumous anthology release)

Notes

References

External links
Poems by Jane Kenyon and biography at PoetryFoundation.org  
 Biography from the Academy of American Poets
 Three poems by Jane Kenyon
 Her poem Otherwise at the Library of Congress
 "The Grandmother Poem", a reminiscence by Donald Hall

1947 births
1995 deaths
20th-century American poets
Writers from Ann Arbor, Michigan
People from Wilmot, New Hampshire
English–Russian translators
Russian–English translators
University of Michigan alumni
Poets from Michigan
Poets from New Hampshire
Poets Laureate of New Hampshire
Deaths from leukemia
Deaths from cancer in New Hampshire
American women poets
20th-century American women writers
20th-century American translators
Hopwood Award winners